Kastellegården is a mansion and gardens in Bohuslän, Sweden. It is located in Kungälv Municipality.

Buildings and structures in Bohuslän
Manor houses in Sweden